John Samuel Stephenson (29 July 1900 – 21 December 1981) was an Australian rules footballer who played with Carlton in the Victorian Football League (VFL) from 1920 to 1922.

His son John played a game for Carlton in 1958.

References

External links 

Jack Stephenson's profile at Blueseum

1900 births
Australian rules footballers from Victoria (Australia)
Carlton Football Club players
1981 deaths